Pleasant Grove Community Church and Cemetery (also known as Methodist Episcopal Church of Milford Township) is a historic church building at 56971 170th Street in Ames, Iowa.  The church was founded in 1873. The building was completed in 1874 and was added to the National Register of Historic Places in 2010.

References

External links
 
 

Methodist churches in Iowa
Churches on the National Register of Historic Places in Iowa
Cemeteries on the National Register of Historic Places in Iowa
Georgian Revival architecture in Iowa
Churches completed in 1874
National Register of Historic Places in Story County, Iowa